Rusa is both a Malay and Indonesian word for deer. It may refer to:
 Rusa (genus), a genus of deer
 Any of four kings of Urartu, an Iron Age kingdom in what is now Turkey and Armenia
 Perodua Rusa, a microvan
 Rusa (grape), another name for the wine grape Gewürztraminer
 Typhoon Rusa, a powerful typhoon which struck South Korea in 2002
 Rusa language

RUSA may refer to:
 Randonneurs USA
 Reference and User Services Association of the American Library Association
 Rutgers University Student Assembly
 Rashtriya Uchchatar Shiksha Abhiyan, a higher education policy in India